Hermachura is a genus of spiders in the family Nemesiidae. It was first described in 1923 by Mello-Leitão. , it contains only one species from Brazil, Hermachura leuderwaldti.

References

Nemesiidae
Monotypic Mygalomorphae genera
Spiders of Brazil